The 2005 DFL-Ligapokal Final decided the winner of the 2005 DFL-Ligapokal, the 9th edition of the reiterated DFL-Ligapokal, a knockout football cup competition.

The match was played on 2 August 2005 at the Zentralstadion in Leipzig. Schalke 04 won the match 1–0 against VfB Stuttgart for their 1st title.

Teams

Route to the final
The DFL-Ligapokal is a six team single-elimination knockout cup competition. There are a total of two rounds leading up to the final. Four teams enter the preliminary round, with the two winners advancing to the semi-finals, where they will be joined by two additional clubs who were given a bye. For all matches, the winner after 90 minutes advances. If still tied, extra time, and if necessary penalties are used to determine the winner.

Match

Details

References

2005
VfB Stuttgart matches
FC Schalke 04 matches
2005–06 in German football cups